The Cossack raid on Istanbul in 1620 was a naval operation by Zaporozhian Cossacks, headed by hetman Yakov Wart-Neroda, on the capital of the Ottoman empire.

Raid 

In 1620 relations between the Ottoman Empire and the Polish-Lithuanian Commonwealth were rapidly deteriorating due to frequent raids from Cossacks. The Ottomans stated that they would break their peace agreement and declare war against Poland if they did not stop the Cossack raids.

The Ottomans promised to abandon these plans if, within four months, the Commonwealth destroyed the Cossacks. Although the Polish ambassador in Istanbul agreed, negotiations soured as the Ottoman ambassador was treated with disrespect. Thus, the Ottomans decided to end the Cossack raids themselves and proceeded to build a string of fortresses in southern Ukraine as preparation. However, the Cossacks had already decided to attack Turkey. Having learned about this, the Polish ambassador immediately escaped from Istanbul. The result of the raid was a Cossack victory.

The Cossacks then raided Varna on the Bulgarian coast, which was under the control of the Ottomans. The city was completely looted.

Consequences 

The raid formed the pretext for the Battle of Cecora (1620).

See also
 Cossack raid on Istanbul (1615)
 Cossack raids on Istanbul (1624)

Sources 
1.  М. Грушевський. Історія України-Руси. Том VII. Розділ VII. Стор. 7.
2. Cepandant les Cosaques aves les 150 barques ravagent toute la mer Noire — l. c. c. 412.
3. Les Cosaques sont á toute heure pros d'ici sur la mer Noire, ou ils font des prises incroiables veu leur faiblesse et sont en telle reputation, qu' il faut des coups de baston pour faire resoudre les soldats turcs à aller à la guerre contre eux sur quelques galères qne le Grand-Seigr y enovoie avec lagrande peine- Депеші д-Сезі с. 412.

Conflicts in 1620
17th century in Istanbul
17th century in the Zaporozhian Host
1620 in the Ottoman Empire
Military history of Turkey
Military history of Ukraine
Cossack raids on the Ottoman Empire